Wedding in Galilee (also known as Arabic عرس الجليل, transliteration ) is a 1987 film directed by Michel Khleifi. It was awarded the International Critics Prize at Cannes in 1987.

Synopsis
The film takes place in a Galilean Palestinian village ruled by an Israeli military governor, following the 1948 Arab-Israeli War.  At the start of the film the village is under a curfew. The village mayor, muktar, wants to celebrate his son's wedding with the traditional elaborate ceremony despite the curfew.  The Israeli military governor initially refuses, but finally allows the wedding to take place on the condition that he and his staff are invited.

Cast
Mohamad Ali El Akili - Mukhtar
Bushra Karaman - Mother
Makram Khoury - The governor
Yussuf Abu-Warda - Bacem (as Youssef Abou Warda)
Anna Achdian- Bride
Nazih Akleh - Groom
Sonia Amar - Soumaya
Eyad Anis - Hassan
Waël Barghouti - Ziad
Juliano Mer - Officer
Ian Chemi - Officer 2
Tali Dorat - Soldier
Ali Al Akili

Awards
International Critics Prize, Cannes 1987
Golden Shell at San Sebastián International Film Festival, 1987
André Cavens Award by the Belgian Film Critics Association, 1987
Tanit d'or at Carthage Film Festival, 1988
Joseph Plateau Awards 1988

References

External links

Further reading
Gertz, Nurith; Khleifi, George  (2008): Palestinian Cinema: Landscape, Trauma, and Memory,   Indiana University Press.  . With:
Wedding in  Galilee, p. 88–93,

Belgian drama films
1987 films
1987 drama films
French drama films
Palestinian drama films
1980s French films